The Anubanini petroglyph, also called Sar-e Pol-e Zohab II or Sarpol-i Zohab relief, is a rock relief from the Akkadian Empire period (circa 2300 BC) or the Isin-Larsa period (early second millennium BC) and is located in Kermanshah Province, Iran. The rock relief is believed to belong to the Lullubi culture and is located 120 kilometers away from the north of Kermanshah, close to Sarpol-e Zahab. Lullubi reliefs are the earliest rock reliefs of Iran, later ones being the Elamite reliefs of Eshkaft-e Salman and Kul-e Farah.

Description
In this rock relief, Anubanini, the king of the Lullubi, puts his foot on the chest of a captive. There are eight other captives, two of them kneeling behind the Lullubian equivalent of the Akkadian goddess Ishtar (recognisable by the four pairs of horns on her headdress and the weapons over her shoulders) and six of them standing in a lower row at the bottom of the rock relief. He is bare-chested, only wearing a short skirt.

The general style of the Anubanini relief emulates the style of Mesopotamian royal art of the period, as well as its language, in using the Akkadian language and script for this inscription.

Inscription
There's also an inscription in the Akkadian language and Akkadian script. In the inscription, he declares himself as the mighty king of Lullubium, who had set up his image as well as that of Ishtar on mount Batir, and calls on various deities to preserve his monument. The inscription begins with the formula:

The date of the rock relief is believed to be circa 2300 BC. It was damaged about 30% during the Iran-Iraq war. Older photographs show in particular a nearly undamaged figure of the king.

Behistun reliefs
This rock relief is very similar to the much later Achaemenid Behistun reliefs (fifth century BC), not located very far, to such an extent that it was said that the Behistun Inscription was influenced by it. The attitude of the ruler, the trampling of an enemy, the presence of a divinity, the lines of prisoners are all very similar.

Details of the relief

Early depictions
The French architect Pascal Coste painted the rock relief as early as 1840.

Other reliefs in the area
The same area of Sar-e Pol-e Zahab, has three more, less well-preserved reliefs.

Lullubian reliefs
Another relief named Sar-e Pol-e Zohab I is about 200 meters away, in a style similar to the Anubanini relief, but this time with a beardless ruler. The attribution to a specific ruler remains uncertain. There are also other Lullubian relief in the same area of Sar-e Pol-e Zahab, showing a beardless warrior trampling a foe, facing a goddess.

Parthian relief
Another relief is located below the Anubanini relief, lower on the cliff. This relief was created during the Parthian Empire in the name of Gotarzes, possibly Gotarzes I, but more probably the Parthian king Gotarzes II, who ruled from 39 to 51 CE and is known to have made other reliefs, such as the equestrian relief at Behistun.
<gallery
 widths="200px" heights="200px" perrow="4">
Anubanini Rock Relief 3.jpg|The second relief, below the Anubanini relief, a Parthian relief.
File:Sar-e_Pol_Parthian_relief.jpeg|Drawing of the Parthian relief.
</gallery>

Dukkan-e Daud Late Achemenid tomb
At Dukkan-e Daud, not far from Sar-e Pol-e Zohab, can be seen a late Achaemenid tomb (circa 400–300 BCE) with the relief of a Zoroastrian priest.

See also

 Persian art
 Lullubi
 Anubanini

References 

Tourist attractions in Kermanshah Province
Archaeological sites in Iran
Sculpture of the Ancient Near East
Rock reliefs in Iran
Behistun Inscription
Akkadian Empire